Cody Michelle Trahan (born February 6, 1988) is an American softball player. She attended Little Cypress-Mauriceville High School in Orange, Texas, graduating in 2006. She later attended Louisiana State University, where she pitched on the LSU Tigers softball team. Trahan led the Tigers to four consecutive NCAA tournament appearances, where they advanced as far as the Super Regionals in 2007.

References

External links
 LSU Tigers bio

1988 births
Living people
LSU Tigers softball players
People from Orange, Texas